Cam and Dursley railway station is a railway station serving the village of Cam and the town of Dursley in Gloucestershire, England. It is located on the main Bristol-Birmingham line, between Yate and Gloucester, at a site close to where Coaley Junction railway station was situated from 1856 to 1965.

The new station
The new station is unstaffed, and consists of two platforms, linked by a footbridge, a car park covered by CCTV and a bus stop with shelter. Passenger facilities consist of shelters with seats on both platforms and a ticket machine, with passenger help points installed in late 2010.

Passenger services are provided by Great Western Railway on a largely hourly basis on the Bristol to Gloucester route. It is the nearest station to the town of Wotton-under-Edge, which is seven miles away.

Bus services, operated by Stagecoach West, run infrequently to the station as of timetable changes in August 2021. The 65 service runs 5 services, 3 in the morning, 2 in the evening to provide links to Gloucester, via Stonehouse and to Stroud, via Dursley and Uley.

Cam and Dursley Train Station, runs to a GWR timetable that links in with services towards Gloucester or towards Bristol. 

There is a rail user group for the station, Coaley Junction Action Committee (CoJAC), which, following the opening of the new station, continues as a group to press for improvements in the service.

The previous station

Coaley Junction station was originally the junction for the short Dursley and Midland Junction Railway branch to Cam and Dursley, built in 1856 and later taken over by the Midland Railway. The station, also known as Dursley Junction, opened to goods on 2 August 1856 and to passengers on 18 September 1856. The station had two short platforms on the main line with a very short and sharply curved platform on the branch. Goods facilities were limited, but included a brick goods shed (still in situ) with a crane. The signal box stood at the end of the platform between the branch and mainline.

The branch closed to passenger traffic on 10 September 1962, although the mainline platforms remained open for passengers until 4 January 1965. The station closed to goods on 28 June 1968, although the branch remained as a long siding to R A Lister and Company's works at Dursley until 13 July 1970.

Stationmasters

J. Harris until 1863 (afterwards 119)
F. Burdett 1863 - 1865 (afterwards station master at Wickwar)
B. Derry 1865 - 1866 
J. Baines 1866 (afterwards station master at Defford)
J. Dawson from 1866 
James Boughton ca. 1870
Reuben Stevens ca. 1871 - 1879 (afterwards station master at Radlett)
Charles Jobbins 1879 - 1881 (formerly station master at Burton Joyce, afterwards station master at Weston, Bath)
Thomas Viney 1881 - 1892  (formerly station master at Selly Oak) 
George J. Goscombe 1892 - 1902 (formerly station master at Wadborough, afterwards station master at Charfield)
H.G. Cooper 1902 (formerly station master at Staple Hill, afterwards station master at Staplehill)
Charles Henry Shill 1902 - 1911 (formerly station master at Staple Hill, afterwards station master at Blackwell)
T. Edgar Brown 1911 - 1926 (formerly station master at Rubery, afterwards station master at Charfield)
William John Havard from 1926 (formerly station master at Sea Mills)

Services 
Great Western Railway's local services operate all services at this station. A new timetable was brought out on 10 December 2006 which saw the introduction of a mostly hourly "clockface" service, and a considerable increase in the number of trains calling, with northbound services (on Mondays to Fridays) increased from 11 to 15 and southbound services increased from 13 to 16. A two-hourly service runs on Sundays between Bristol and Gloucester only.

|-
|colspan=5|Stopping at Coaley Junction railway station

References

External links

CoJAC, the rail user group for Cam and Dursley station

Stroud District
Railway stations in Gloucestershire
Railway stations in Great Britain opened in 1994
Railway stations opened by Railtrack
Railway stations served by Great Western Railway
Dursley
DfT Category F2 stations